Jim Brown (18 December 1926 – 8 April 2014) was  a former Australian rules footballer who played with Fitzroy in the Victorian Football League (VFL).

In 1948 Brown moved to Tasmania and played with New Norfolk in the Tasmanian Football League. He won the William Leitch Medal, the competition Best and Fairest that year.

Notes

External links 
		

1926 births
2014 deaths
Australian rules footballers from Victoria (Australia)
Fitzroy Football Club players
Ivanhoe Amateurs Football Club players
New Norfolk Football Club players